Spitak is a 2018 Armenian drama film directed by Alexander Kott. It was selected as the Armenian entry for the Best Foreign Language Film at the 91st Academy Awards, but it was not nominated.

Cast
 Aleksandr Kuznetsov as Viktor
 Olivier Pagès as Jerome
 Oleg Vasilkov as Sergey

See also
 List of submissions to the 91st Academy Awards for Best Foreign Language Film
 List of Armenian submissions for the Academy Award for Best Foreign Language Film

References

External links
 

2018 films
2018 drama films
Armenian drama films
Armenian-language films